Joe or Joseph Vitale is the name of:

 Joe Vitale (musician) (born 1949), American drummer and keyboard player
 Joseph Vitale (author) (born 1953), American author and spiritual teacher
 Joe F. Vitale (born 1954), American politician
 Joe Vitale (ice hockey) (born 1985), American ice hockey player